"Slice" is the title track and the second single from Five for Fighting's 2009 album of the same name.

The song is a nostalgic tribute to Don McLean's "American Pie", featuring a reference to "Chevys and levees" in the first verse and the line "We were more than just a slice of American pie" in the chorus.

Chart performance
"Slice" peaked at number 33 on the US Adult Pop Songs chart and number 11 on the US Adult Contemporary chart.

Charts

Year-end charts

References

Five for Fighting songs
2009 songs
Songs written by John Ondrasik
Songs written by Gregg Wattenberg